European championships in football may refer to:

 UEFA Champions League (clubs)
 UEFA European Championship
 UEFA European Under-21 Championship
 UEFA European Under-19 Championship
 UEFA European Under-17 Championship